Hawmps! is a 1976 American Western slapstick film about a United States Cavalry experiment to introduce camels into the service in the western United States, specifically Texas. The cast included James Hampton, Christopher Connelly and Slim Pickens.

It was written by William Bickley, Joe Camp, and Michael Warren, directed by Joe Camp, and produced by Mulberry Square Productions.

Plot

Howard Clemmons tells his grandchildren about his adventures as a young U.S. Cavalry Lieutenant in 1854. Clemmons had no seniority, power or talent for the army and was therefore chosen to lead an experimental project using camels as cavalry mounts in the southwest U.S. Clemmons remembers arriving at Fort Val Verde, Texas, where Sgt. Uriah Tibbs is expecting Arabian horses. When Tibbs explains that he and his men competed for the privilege of being in the project, Clemmons declines to tell him the “Arabians” are actually camels. Clemmons then reports to the fort's commander, Col. Seymour Hawkins, who is more interested in his cannon practice than Clemmons's camel project. Later, Clemmons inspects the troops, including Nathaniel R. Higgins, who informs Clemmons that he re-enlisted so he could ride an Arabian horse. Although Clemmons wants to tell the men the truth, he is interrupted when a cook throws dishwater out the door and soaks him. When Clemmons and Tibbs later discuss the project at the saloon, they are accosted by Sgt. Naman Tucker, who is outraged his troopers did not receive the Arabian horses. A drunken Clemmons slides under the table as the two sergeants fight.

The next day, the camels arrive, but the troops ride their horses back to the fort in disgust, leaving Clemmons to deal with the camels. Hi Jolly, an Arab camel trainer, reports to Clemmons and as they herd camels through town, horses stampede in fright, ladies scream and dogs bark in fear. A wagon overturns, and a barrel splits open covering Col. Hawkins's daughter, Jennifer, in molasses. Hawkins berates Clemmons for the damage and plans to cancel the project, but Clemmons declares that the orders came from Jefferson Davis, the Secretary of War. That night, Jennifer sneaks into Clemmons's room, pours a small crock of molasses over his head, and declares them even before inviting him to afternoon tea. The next day, Hi Jolly gives his first lesson in camel care as Tucker rides up and insults Tibbs's men. Clemmons warns Tucker that if he insults the camel corps again, Clemmons will put him on report and transfer him into the camel project. To the cheers of Tibbs's men, Tucker apologizes and rides away. As Hi Jolly congratulates his comrade on raising the men's morale, Clemmons faints. Over time, the soldiers continue their camel training, but the lessons do not go well. When the men finally learn to mount the camels, the animals run wild, dumping them in the dirt and water troughs. That night, the men bet Tucker he cannot lasso a camel. When Tucker lands the rope around the camel's neck, the beast runs in panic, dragging Tucker behind. The next morning, the camel returns, still dragging Tucker, bleeding and bruised.

As weeks pass, the men become proficient with their camels and Clemmons romances Jennifer. He is ordered to capture a Native American renegade and Clemmons and his men pursue the outlaws, but they are thrown off their camels at a river. Later, Hi Jolly explains that camels are afraid of water; if Clemmons had dismounted and demonstrated the water was shallow, the camels would have crossed. That night, Jennifer takes a stroll with Clemmons, who tells her Col. Hawkins is cancelling the camel project. When Clemmons whines that he is a failure, Jennifer scolds him for being too cowardly to fight for his career.

The next morning, Clemmons proposes a 300-mile race to the town of Dos Rios between his camels and Tucker's horses. When Hawkins declines, Clemmons deceitfully claims that the camel experiment is the President's pet project. Sometime later, Hi Jolly is injured in a barroom brawl and cannot ride. Before the race, Jennifer gives Clemmons a thick book on camels and kisses him. Col. Hawkins fires a cannon and the race is on. Tucker's horses outpace Clemmons's camels, but within a few days, Clemmons's men catch up. However, Clemmons learns from Corporal Leroy that Tucker and his men are captured by an outlaw named Bad Jack Cutter at Dagger's Point. Clemmons insists on rescuing Tucker and his men. Along the way, Clemmons and Tibbs capture two other outlaws, steal their clothes and horses, then ride into town in disguise to meet Bad Jack, agreeing to join his gang. Later, they find Tucker and his men in jail and try to pull out the window bars using a horse. When the horse fails, a camel demolishes the entire jail. Tucker and his men run, leaving Tibbs and Clemmons to face the outlaws alone. A gunfight ensues but Clemmons's men ride in on camelback, rescuing their leaders, and ride off before the outlaws can get to their horses. That night, Clemmons discovers they have lost the camel carrying all but one of their water barrels. Although Clemmons believes they can find water in the mountains, Tibbs insists they follow the map to the next waterhole. After two days of riding, they discover the hole is dry, and they are out of water. Tibbs wants to ride back to a river, but Clemmons convinces Tibbs to let him try to reach the mountains, ordering Tibbs to head to the river if he does not return by sunset. Clemmons finds water, but as he ties the barrel onto his camel, a shot rings out. Black Jack exchanges gunfire with Clemmons as the camel runs away. After sundown, the camel reaches Tibbs and his men. The men drink their fill, then realize Clemmons is missing. The next morning, Black Jack realizes Clemmons is out of ammunition. He climbs down the rocks and shoots Clemmons in the chest but as he celebrates, Tibbs and the men capture him. Much to Tibbs's surprise, Clemmons is saved by the book Jennifer gave him; it was inside his jacket and stopped Bad Jack's bullet.

Later, Clemmons's troop races past Tucker and his men's exhausted horses outside Dos Rios. As Clemmons celebrates his victory, a telegram arrives from Washington, D.C., reporting that Congress has approved construction of the transcontinental railroad and the camel project is therefore unnecessary. Clemmons is ordered to turn the camels loose, but Tibbs and the men protest, concerned that the camels will perish in the American desert. As Clemmons finishes telling the story to his grandchildren, his wife, Jennifer, announces that dinner is ready. Clemmons goes outside to ring the dinner triangle, but Hi Jolly, Higgins and Tibbs report that one of the camels is in labor. As the four old men walk to the barn, Higgins wonders if they could move the camels closer to the house because he is tired that “each day he must walk a mile for a camel.”

Cast
 James Hampton as Lieutenant Howard Clemmons
 Christopher Connelly as Sergeant Uriah Tibbs
 Slim Pickens as Sergeant Naman Tucker
 Denver Pyle as Colonel Seymour Hawkins
 Gino Conforti as Hi Jolly
 Mimi Maynard as Jennifer Hawkins
 Jack Elam as Bad Jack Cutter
 Lee de Broux as Fitzgerald
 Herb Vigran as Smitty
 Jesse Davis as Mariachi Singer
 Frank Inn as Cook
 Larry Swartz as Corporal LeRoy
 Mike Travis as Arthur Logan
 Tiny Wells as Nathaniel R. Higgins
 Dick Drake as Drake
 Henry Kendrick as Colonel Randolph Zachary
 Don Starr as Major Bill Haney
 Cynthia Smith as Granddaughter
 Roy Gunsberg as Old Man
 Rex Janssen as Grandson 
 Catherine Hearne as Zelda
 Larry Strawbridge as Major
 James Weir as Private
 Alvin Wright as Crazy Feathers
 Lee Tiplitsky as Drunk
 Joe Camp III as Telegraph Boy
 Perry Martin as Frontiersman
 Sheba as Herself
 Valentine as She-Baby Camel
 Richard Lundin as Stage Driver
 Charles Starkey as Man
 Benjoe as Benji
 Tiffany as White Dog
 Robert Elliott as Horse Soldier 1
 Chris Frey as Horse Soldier 2
 Raymond Kochel as Horse Soldier 3
 Bo Spafford as Horse Soldier 4
 Jim Spahn as Horse Soldier 5
 Bud Stout as Horse Soldier 6
 Dale Walker as Horse Soldier 7
 Steven C. Brown as Bad Guy 1 (uncredited)

See also
 Camel cavalry
 Hi Jolly
 U.S. Camel Corps

References

External links
 
 

1976 films
1976 comedy films
1970s Western (genre) comedy films
1970s adventure comedy films
American Western (genre) comedy films
American adventure comedy films
American children's films
Films directed by Joe Camp
Films scored by Euel Box
Films shot in California
Western (genre) cavalry films
1970s English-language films
1970s American films